Süloğlu Dam is a dam in Süloğlu district, Edirne Province, Turkey. The development was backed by the Turkish State Hydraulic Works and was built between 1975 and 1981.

See also
List of dams and reservoirs in Turkey

References
DSI directory, State Hydraulic Works (Turkey), Retrieved December 16, 2009

Dams in Edirne Province